Royal standard, royal flag, or royal banner may refer to:

Flags 
Several countries use the term royal standard to describe the flag used by the monarch and members of the royal family:
 Royal Standard of Australia
 Royal Standard of Bahrain
 Royal Standard of Belgium
 Royal Standard of Brunei
 Royal Standard of Cambodia
 Royal Standards of Canada
 Royal Standard of Denmark
 Royal Standard of Eswatini
 Royal Standard of Jamaica
 Royal Standard of Jordan
 Royal Standard of Lesotho
 Princely Standard of Liechtenstein
 Grand Ducal Standard of Luxembourg
 Royal Standard of Malaysia
 Princely Standard of Monaco
 Royal Standard of Morocco
 Royal Standard of the Netherlands
 Royal Standard of New Zealand
 Royal Standard of Norway
 Royal Standard of Oman
 Royal Standard of Saudi Arabia
 Royal Standard of Spain
 Royal Standard of Sweden
 Royal Standard of Thailand
 Royal Standard of Tonga
 Royal Standard of the United Kingdom
 Princely standard of Wales (for the Prince of Wales)

Former royal standards
 Royal Standard of Afghanistan (1931–1973)
 Royal Standard of the Nawab of Baoni (before 1948)
 Royal Standard of Barbados (1975–2021)
 Royal Standard of the Maharaja of Baroda (before 1948)
 Royal Standard of the Tsar of Bulgaria (before 1946)
 Royal Bend of Castile, the battle standard of the Castilian monarchs (from the Middle Ages to the 16th century)
 Royal Standard of the Maharana of Danta (before 1948)
 Royal Standard of Egypt (1923–1953)
 Royal Banner of England (c. 1198–1603)
 Royal Standard of France (before 1792; 1814–1830)
 Royal Standard of Germany (1871–1918)
 Royal Standard of Greece (1863–1924; 1936–1974)
 Royal Standard of the Maharaja of Gwalior (before 1948)
 Royal Standard of Hawaii (1874–1893)
 Royal Standard of Iraq (1930–1958)
 Royal Standard of Italy (1880–1946)
 Royal Standard of the Maharaja of Jaisalmer (still in use)
 Royal Standard of Korea
 Royal Standard of Laos (1949–1975)
 Royal Standard of Libya (1951–1969)
Royal Standard of Madagascar (before 1885)
 Royal Standard of Malta (1967–1974)
 Royal Standard of Mauritius (1968–1992)
 Royal Standard of Montenegro (1861–1918)
 Royal Standard of Nepal
 Personal Standards of the Kings of Portugal (until 1910)
 Royal Standard of Romania (1881–1947)
 Royal Banner of Scotland
 Royal Standard of Serbia (1902–1917)
 Royal Standard of Trinidad (1966–1976)
 Royal Standard of Vietnam (1788–1955)
 Royal Standard of Yugoslavia (1922–1941)

Other
 Royal Standard (1863), an auxiary steamer ship of the White Star Line

See also
 Imperial standard
 Presidential standard